Firebite is an Australian streaming television drama series created by Warwick Thornton which premiered on AMC+ on 16 December 2021 and ran for 8 episodes until 3 February 2022.

Premise
Set in a remote mining town in the middle of the South Australian desert, the series centers around two Indigenous Australian hunters, Tyson and Shanika, who protect their home Opal City from vampires. Their lives are turned upside down when a former hunter from Tyson’s past shows up informing them the last vampire king has arrived with plans that will shift the balance in their war against the vampires.

Cast
 Rob Collins as Tyson Walker. A former Blood Hunter, and Shanika’s guardian. He uses Kangaroo Hunting as cover to hide hunting vampires. He acts immature when raising Shanika but is protective of her and keeps his community safe. He is skilled in using the Indigenous hooked boomerang in hunting vampires. His favorite song is 'Black Boy' by Coloured Stone
 Shantae Barnes-Cowan as Shanika "Neeks". Tyson's partner and adoptive daughter. She is proud of her Indigenous roots and despises racism toward her and her people. Her Mom was taken when she was a child resulting in Tyson raising and training her. She loves Tyson but will speak her mind when she wishes to take the fight further with the vampires. 
 Yael Stone as Eleona. A barmaid in Spud's bar. She has a fling with Tyson. She's revealed to be a vampire who left the Last King to live in peace. She was a mother before the King forced her to feed on her baby resulting in her hate for him and desire for his death.  
 Callan Mulvey as The Last Vampire King. Last of the 11 original Vampire Lords who invaded Australia. He is cruel, sociopathic, intelligent, and ruthless. He killed Jalingbirri's team upon his arrival. 
Jai Koutrae as Spud. Owner of a bar Tyson frequents often. He is partners with Eleona and knows her secret letting her buy him off for access to his tunnels. He also deals in illegal dynamite sales.
Kelton Pell as Jalingbirri. A veteran Blood Hunter and Tyson's mentor. He follows the traditional lore of hunting vampires and disapproves of Tyson's lifestyle. He chased after the Last King but was injured and saved by Tyson and Shanika from the tunnels after an ambush. He owns a modified Semi-trailer truck that houses his weapons and gear.
Ngaire Pigram as Kitty Sinclair. Tyson's ex-girlfriend. He still harbors feelings but usually misses his chance. She works at the clinic and cares for Shanika's well-being. She's unaware of vampires and Tyson's past resulting in her believing he's irresponsible in raising Shanika. 
Tessa Rose as Aunty Maria. The leader of her community. She knows of vampires and tries to hide their existence to avoid panic in the community. She knows about Tyson's history and tries to get him to take his hunting seriously. 
Greg Tait as Smokey. A member of the community who lost all his siblings to the vampires. He wishes for revenge for their deaths. He holds Maria and Tyson responsible for hiding the truth.

Episodes

Production

Development
In June 2021 AMC Studios greenlit a co-production between AMC Studios and See-Saw Films an 8-part series which is set to be written and directed by Warwick Thornton and Brendan Fletcher. In August, Tony Krawitz joined as a director and AMC+ announced that Yael Stone, Rob Collins and Callan Mulvey would have leading roles. The series will also star Shantae Barnes-Cowan.

Filming
The series began filming in August 2021, and is filmed in the traditional Country of the Antakirinja Matu-Yankunytjatjara people of the Western Desert and Kaurna People of the Adelaide Plains in and around Adelaide, the regional town of Coober Pedy, and at the Adelaide Studios in South Australia.

Release
On 7 November 2021, AMC released first look images and announced that the series was scheduled to be released 16 December 2021. In Australia the series will be released via the AMC bundle on both Apple TV and Amazon Prime.

Reception 
The review aggregator website Rotten Tomatoes reports a 86% approval rating with an average rating of 7.20/10, based on 7 reviews for the first season.

References

2021 Australian television series debuts
2020s Australian drama television series
English-language television shows
Television shows set in South Australia
AMC (TV channel) original programming
Vampires in television